Ali Ahmed Al-Zaqaan (born 1 November 1991) is a Saudi professional footballer who plays as a winger for Saudi club Al-Fayha.

References

External links 
 

1991 births
Living people
Saudi Arabian footballers
Ettifaq FC players
Al-Wehda Club (Mecca) players
Al-Fateh SC players
Ittihad FC players
Al-Fayha FC players
Saudi First Division League players
Saudi Professional League players
Association football midfielders
Saudi Arabian Shia Muslims